The Pleotomini are a tribe of fireflies in the large subfamily Lampyrinae.

Systematics
The group has recently been examined using molecular phylogenetics, using fairly comprehensive sampling.

Genera
 Calyptocephalus Gray, 1832
 Ophoelis Olivier, 1911
 Phaenolis Gorham, 1880
 Pleotomodes Green, 1948
 Pleotomus LeConte, 1881
 Roleta McDermott, 1962

References

Lampyridae
Beetle tribes